Tillandsia grazielae is a species in the genus Tillandsia. This species is endemic to Brazil.  It was named after the botanist Graziela Maciel Barroso.

References

grazielae
Endemic flora of Brazil